This is a list of Spanish television related events in 1988.

Events 
 11 January: TVE broadcast Theatre play ‘’Sí al amor’’, starred by Lina Morgan , which is viewed by 17 million people, becoming the most popular TV show that year.
 25 January: Canal 10, first private TV channel in Spain is launched.
 14 December: Following the 1988 Spanish general strike Spanish Television stops broadcasting.

Debuts

Television shows

La 1

Ending this year

La 1

Foreign series debuts in Spain

Births 
 9 March - Elena Furiase, actress
 18 April - Nicolás Coronado, actor
 26 April - Macarena García, actress
 30 April - Ana de Armas, actress
 19 May - Nando Escribano, host 
 6 July - Ylenia Padilla, pundit 
 14 August - Loreto Mauleón, actress.
 16 August - Angie Rigueiro, journalist
 17 October - Marina Salas, actress
 21 October - Blanca Suárez, actress
 30 September - Brays Efe, actor.
 30 October - Cristina Pedroche, hostess
 28 November - Adrián Rodríguez, actor & singer
 14 December - Ana María Polvorosa, actress

Deaths 
 22 February - Carlos Lemos, 79
 22 April - María Luisa Seco, hostess, 39
 12 July - Luis Pruneda, host, 64
 23 September - Luis Losada, journalist, 59
 14 November - Julia Caba Alba, actress, 76

See also
1988 in Spain
List of Spanish films of 1988

References 

1988 in Spanish television